is a 2013 Japanese film directed by Katsuhide Motoki, and released by Warner Bros. in Japan on 22 November 2013. Inspired by the 2003 British romantic comedy Love Actually, the film is made up of six separate stories revolving around ten people at Tokyo Station just before Christmas. It was produced to commemorate the 100th anniversary of Tokyo Station, and was filmed with full cooperation by the railway company JR East.

Stories

Cast

Story 1: Eve no Koibito
 Hiroshi Tamaki as Kazuki Kuroyama, a company president
 Rin Takanashi as Reiko Sasaki, an aspiring actress

Story 2: Enkyori Renai
 Fumino Kimura as Yukina Yamaguchi, a fashion designer
 Masahiro Higashide as Takumi Tsumura, a construction worker

Story 3: Christmas no Yūki
 Tsubasa Honda as Natsumi Otomo, a cake shop employee

Story 4: Christmas Present
 Miwako Ichikawa as Chiharu Kishimoto, an orphanage worker
 Emiri Kai as Akane Terai

Story 5: Nibun no Ichi Seijinshiki
 Saburō Tokitō as Masayuki Miyazaki, a train driver
 Nene Otsuka as Saori Miyazaki, Masayuki's wife
 Ryutaro Yamasaki as Koji Miyazaki, their son

Story 6: Okurete Kita Present
 Chieko Baisho as Kotoko Oshima, a Tokyo Station pastry shop employee
 Nenji Kobayashi as Taizo Matsuura

Special screenings
The film was screened at the 26th Tokyo International Film Festival on 23 October 2013.

References

External links
  
 It All Began When I Met You at KineNote 
 

2013 films
Japanese anthology films
Japanese remakes of foreign films
Films directed by Katsuhide Motoki
Films scored by Yoshihiro Ike
2010s Japanese-language films